Sin Wai Kin (formerly Victoria Sin, born 1991) is a Canadian visual artist who uses "speculative fiction within drag performance, moving image, writing and print to refigure attitudes towards gender, sexuality and historical discourses of identity." They are known for their immersive performance art and drag artistry, a practice which they use to "interrupt normative processes of desire, identification, and objectification."

Sin's drag aesthetic references range from Jessica Rabbit to Marilyn Monroe. Their drag serves to destabilise essentialist and binary notions of gender by illustrating its performative nature. Further, in their own words, their drag practice is a mechanism of "exercising entitlement" and taking up space in predominantly white, male spaces.

Sin's visual art practice surfaces and critiques the labour of performing femininity, Western beauty standards and "identification with gendered and raced imagery and the ways it is inscribed and performed on bodies." These themes emerge in Sin's series of used makeup wipes which act as a "relic of the performance, or the labour that was done that evening."

Sin is also known for investigating speculative fiction as a medium to surface and platform intersectional queer experience, most notably in their project Dream Babes, an ongoing series of events, performances and publications. They are particularly interested storytelling as a collective way of narrating the marginalised experience, and in the use of "science fiction as a way of visualizing alternative narratives and social structures to those in our own social context."

Early life 
Born in Toronto, Ontario, Sin moved to London in 2009. They studied a BA in Drawing at Camberwell College of Arts before obtaining an MA in Print at The Royal College of Art in 2017. Sin first became interested in drag at age 17 when they would visit gay bars and drag nights with their friends. Shortly after moving to London in 2009, Sin became involved in the queer creative scene, running club nights with friends and beginning to experiment with drag. It was through "a process of doing drag and purposefully putting on a gender and then taking it off again" that Sin came to realise they are non-binary.

Career 
In 2020, Sin co-wrote and performed as a vocalist on "The Th1ng", a single from Yaeji taken from the album 'WHAT WE DREW 우리가 그려왔던'.

In 2019, Sin performed their pieces A View From Elsewhere and If I had the words to tell you we wouldn’t be here now as part of the 58th Venice Bienniale. Sin also featured in Hayward Gallery's Kiss My Genders, an exhibition comprising work by 'more than 30 international artists whose work explores and engages with gender identity.'

In 2018, Sin performed as part of the Serpentine Pavilion Park Nights Programme. The performance, titled The sky as an image, an image as a net, was described as "a ballad of embodiment, longing and transformation, using poetry, drag, science fiction and an original soundtrack by Shy One." Sin has also recently performed and exhibited at Hayward Gallery, Sotheby's S|2, Taipei Contemporary Art Centre, Whitechapel Gallery, Institute of Contemporary Arts British Museum and RISD Museum. Their work was included in the exhibition Age of You, at the Museum of Contemporary Art, Toronto in 2019.

In 2017, Sin was awarded the Young Contemporary Talent Prize by The Ingram Collection. In 2022 Sin was nominated for the Turner Prize.

References 

1991 births
Living people
21st-century Canadian artists
Alumni of Camberwell College of Arts
Alumni of the Royal College of Art
Canadian expatriates in the United Kingdom
Canadian drag queens
Canadian LGBT artists
Non-binary artists
Artists from Toronto
Women performance artists
Non-binary drag performers
21st-century Canadian LGBT people